Bernard Cohen may refer to:
 Bernard Cohen (physicist) (1924–2012), American physicist at the University of Pittsburgh
 I. Bernard Cohen (1914–2003),American  professor of the history of science at Harvard University
 Bernard Cohen (painter) (born 1933), British artist
 Bernard Cohen (Australian author) (born 1963), Australian writer
 Bernard Cecil Cohen (born 1926), former chancellor of University of Wisconsin, Madison
 Bernard S. Cohen (1934–2020), American politician and member of the Virginia House of Delegates

See also
Bernard Cohn (disambiguation)